Szentendre Artists' Colony existed from the 1920s to the 1930s in the northern part of Szentendre, Hungary.

Background

The colony was founded by the Szentendre Artists' Association. They followed the tradition of the 19th century Nagybánya artists' colony but combined it with the modern styles of the era, mainly surrealism and constructivism.

Members

The most important painters of the site 

 Barcsay Jenő
 Deim Pál
 Kerényi Jenő
 Körniss Dezső
 Vajda Lajos

Other members 

 Bánáti Sverák József
 Bánovszky Miklós
 Heintz Henrik
 Jeges Ernő
 Onódi Béla
 Paizs Goebel Jenő
 Rozgonyi László

Gallery

References 

 https://www.hung-art.hu/vezetes/szente_h.html (In Hungarian)
 Művészeti lexikon. 3. kiad. 4. köt. Budapest : Akadémiai, 1981–1984.  (In Hungarian)



Hungarian painters
Szentendre